The UWF Tag Team Championship was the tag team title in the Universal Wrestling Federation from 1986 until the promotion closed in 1987. It was formerly known as the Mid-South Tag Team Championship from 1979 until 1986 when Mid-South Wrestling became the UWF.

Title history

Footnotes

See also
Universal Wrestling Federation
NWA Tri-State Tag Team Championship
GWF Tag Team Championship

References

Mid-South Wrestling championships
Universal Wrestling Federation (Bill Watts) championships
Tag team wrestling championships